Iveta Koka (born 9 March 1982) is a Latvian ice hockey forward, currently playing in the Swedish Damettan with the women's representative team of Haninge Anchors HC. She began playing with the Latvian national team in 1995 and holds the title for most career points in team history. During her nine-season career in the Swedish Women's Hockey League (SDHL), she scored over 240 points and is the all-time leading scorer from Latvia.

Playing career   
Early in her career, Koka played in the Russian Women's Hockey League with HC Tornado and in the Swiss Leistungsklasse A with the Ladies Team Lugano. From 2012 to 2018, she played for Leksands IF Dam in the Riksserien (renamed SDHL in 2016), putting up over a point per game with 179 points (81 goals + 98 assists) in 176 games for the club. , she stands as the third highest scorer in Leksands history.

After leaving Leksands, she joined AIK Hockey Dam in Stockholm for the 2018–19 SDHL season. After scoring only 6 points in 19 games in the 2019–20 SDHL season, she signed an extension with the club and posted 4 points in her first 7 games of the 2020–21 season.

International play  
Koka made her debut with the Latvian national team at the 1995 IIHF European Women Championships, several weeks after her thirteenth birthday. Her next major international tournament was the 1999 Women's World Ice Hockey Championships – Pool B, the first lower-divisions tournament to be organized unde the IIHF Women's World Championship, where she recorded 3 goals and 7 assists (10 points) in five games and was selected as Best Forward of the tournament by the directorate. She scored six points in five games at the lower divisions championships the next year, held in her native Latvia.

After Latvia was relegated in 2008, she scored 20 points in 5 games at the 2009 IIHF Women's World Championship Division II, earning honors as tournament MVP, contributing significantly to Latvia's undefeated streak and leading the team to gaining promotion right back to Division I. In 2014, she captained the country to promotion from Division 1B to 1A.

In total, Koka served as Latvian national team captain during six international seasons, most recently during the qualification tournament for the 2018 Winter Olympics.

References

External links
 

Living people
1982 births
Latvian women's ice hockey players
Latvian ice hockey left wingers
Women's ice hockey forwards
AIK Hockey Dam players
Leksands IF Dam players
HC Tornado players
Expatriate ice hockey players in Sweden
Latvian expatriate ice hockey people
Latvian expatriate sportspeople in Sweden
Expatriate ice hockey players in Russia
Latvian expatriate sportspeople in Russia
Expatriate ice hockey players in Switzerland
Latvian expatriate sportspeople in Switzerland